Tommy Drumm (born 22 March 1955) is an Irish former sportsperson. He lived on Collins Avenue West. He attended (Primary) The School of the Holy Child, Larkhill, Whitehall, and (Secondary) St Aidan's Christian brothers School, Dublin 9. He played Gaelic football with his local club Whitehall Gaels, renamed Whitehall Colmcille's GAA and was a senior member of the Dublin county team from 1976 until 1984. Drumm captained Dublin to the All-Ireland title in 1983.

References

 

1955 births
Living people
All-Ireland-winning captains (football)
Dublin inter-county Gaelic footballers
Gaelic football backs
Sportspeople from Dublin (city)
Texaco Footballers of the Year
Whitehall Colmcille Gaelic footballers
Winners of three All-Ireland medals (Gaelic football)
People educated at St Aidan's C.B.S.